The 1926 Toledo Rockets football team was an American football team that represented Toledo University (renamed the University of Toledo in 1967) during the 1926 college football season. Led by first-year coach Boni Petcoff, Toledo compiled a 3–5 overall record and 1–2 in conference play.

Schedule

References

Toledo
Toledo Rockets football seasons
Toledo Rockets football